William Bissell may refer to:

 William Henry Bissell (1811–1860), governor of the U.S. state of Illinois
 William G. Bissell (1857–1925), member of the Wisconsin State Senate
 William Nanda Bissell (born 1966), Indian businessman and the chairman of Fabindia